The Tour de Corse is a rally first held in 1956 on the island of Corsica. It was the French round of the World Rally Championship from the inaugural 1973 season until 2008, was part of the Intercontinental Rally Challenge from 2011 to 2012, and finally returned to WRC in 2015. The name "Tour de Corse" refers to the fact that in the early days it was run around the island; nowadays it only features roads around Ajaccio. The rally is held on asphalt roads, and is known as the "Ten Thousand Turns Rally" because of the twisty mountain roads.

Several drivers have been killed during the event, including fatalities at 3 consecutive events. Attilio Bettega, driving a Lancia 037 Rally, died during the fourth special stage of the 1985 rally, Zérubia-Santa Giulia. On May 2 1986, exactly a year later, Henri Toivonen and his co-driver Sergio Cresto died in their Lancia Delta S4 during the 18th stage of the event, Corte-Taverna. Almost a year later in 1987, co-driver French Corsican Jean-Michel Argenti and driver Jean Marchini fatally crashed similarly to those before them.

The first running of the rally was won by the Belgian female driver Gilberte Thirion in a Renault Dauphine. Two drivers have won the event a record six times; Bernard Darniche (1970, 1975, 1977, 1978, 1979 and 1981) and Didier Auriol (1988, 1989, 1990, 1992, 1994, 1995). The only non-French drivers to win the event more than once are Sandro Munari, Markku Alén, Colin McRae and Thierry Neuville.

It has been largely popularized that Toivonen and Cresto's deaths sealed the fate of Group B rallying due to the realization that the cars had too much pure power and lack of containment, proving to be dangerous and potentially fatal to spectators.

Winners

In 1996, due to the World Rally Championship's event rotation system used from 1994–96, the rally counted only for the FIA 2-Litre World Championship for Manufacturers. The 2009 event was part of the France Cup.

*, denotes years when Tour de Corse was not part of the World Rally Championship

Multiple winners

References

External links

 Official site
 Tour de Corse at eWRC-results

 
Corse
Corse
Recurring sporting events established in 1956